Yves Prigent (born 30 August 1993) is a French slalom canoeist who has competed at the international level since 2011.

He won three medals at the ICF Canoe Slalom World Championships with two golds (Mixed C2: 2017, C2 team: 2015) and a silver (Mixed C2: 2018).

His partner in the men's C2 boat was Loïc Kervella. His partner in the mixed C2 boat is Margaux Henry.

His father Jean-Yves is a former slalom canoeist and medalist from World Championships. His younger sister Camille is also a slalom canoeist.

World Cup individual podiums

References

External links

French male canoeists
Living people
1993 births
Medalists at the ICF Canoe Slalom World Championships